Irene Foote was an international lawn bowls competitor for New Zealand.

Bowls career

World Championships
Foote won three gold medals in the triples with Noeleen Scott and Cis Winstanley, the fours with Scott, Winstanley and Verna Devlin and the team event (Taylor Trophy) at the 1973 World Outdoor Bowls Championship in Wellington, New Zealand.

Four years later she won a bronze medal as part of the New Zealand team at the 1977 World Outdoor Bowls Championship in Worthing.

National
Foote won five National Champion of Champion singles titles and was inducted into the Bowls New Zealand Hall of Fame in 2013.

References

Date of birth unknown
Date of death unknown
New Zealand female bowls players
Bowls World Champions
Living people
Year of birth missing (living people)